M213 or M-213 may refer to:

M213, a .50 caliber machine gun
M-213 (Michigan highway), a former state highway in Michigan